Meinrad, OSB (797 – 21 January 861 AD) was a German Benedictine hermit and is revered as a Catholic and Orthodox saint. He is known as the "Martyr of Hospitality". His feast day is 21 January.

Life
Meinrad was born into the family of the Counts of Hohenzollern and was educated at the abbey school of Reichenau, an island in Lake Constance, under his kinsmen, the Benedictine Abbots Hatto and Erlebald. There he became a monk and was ordained.

After some years at Reichenau, and the dependent priory at Benken, St. Gallen near Lake Zurich, around 829 he embraced an eremitical life and established his hermitage on the slopes of Etzel Pass, taking with him a wonder-working statue of the Virgin Mary which he had been given by the Abbess Hildegarde of Zurich. Because so many people sought him out, in 835 he retreated to a hermitage in the forest on the site of today's monastery in Einsiedeln. Inspired by the Desert Fathers, Meinrad practiced a strict asceticism. Gifts presented to him he passed on to poor. He was killed in 861 by two robbers who wanted the treasures which pilgrims left at the shrine. Meinrad is known as the Martyr of Hospitality.

Over the next eighty years, the hermitage was occupied by a succession of hermits. One of them, named Eberhard, previously Provost of Strasburg, erected a monastery, Einsiedeln Abbey, and became its first abbot. Meinrad was originally buried at Reichenau, but his relics were returned to Einsiedeln in 1029.

Veneration
During the Middle Ages, Einsiedeln became a popular place of pilgrimage for people from southern Germany, Switzerland, and Alsace. Meinrad's cell became the shrine of the Black Madonna of Einsiedel. Over the years dust and the smoke of candles, oil lamps and incense darkened the image. In 1803 the hands and face were painted black.

The Chapel St. Meinrad at the summit of the Etzel Pass is first mentioned in the 13th century. The chapel and a nearby inn are located on the pilgrimage route of Camino de Santiago, which continues from the Zurich Oberland over the Etzel Pass to Einsiedeln and from there to the northern Spanish town of Santiago de Compostela.

The Feast Day of St. Meinrad is on 21 January.

St. Meinrad Archabbey in St. Meinrad, Indiana, is named for him.

See also 
 Einsiedeln Abbey, Switzerland
 Hohenzollern
 Saint Meinrad School of Theology
 St. Meinrad Archabbey, Indiana

References 

 
 St. Meinrad (German language)
Attwater, Donald and Catherine Rachel John. The Penguin Dictionary of Saints. 3rd edition. New York: Penguin Books, 1993. .
 The Ecole Glossary

861 deaths
German hermits
Einsiedeln
Year of birth unknown
Year of birth uncertain